Ammadies is an abandoned village in the Tilliria region of north-western Cyprus. De facto, Ammadies is under the control of Northern Cyprus.

References

Communities in Nicosia District
Populated places in Lefke District
Mediterranean port cities and towns in Northern Cyprus